Vallirana is a municipality in the comarca of Baix Llobregat, Barcelona Province, Catalonia, Spain. It is located at the feet of Serra d'Ordal, not far from Barcelona city, close to the Llobregat river.

References

 Panareda Clopés, Josep Maria; Rios Calvet, Jaume; Rabella Vives, Josep Maria (1989). Guia de Catalunya, Barcelona: Caixa de Catalunya.  (Spanish).  (Catalan).

External links

 Vallirana Town Hall webpage
 Government data pages 
 Patrimoni històric i artístic de Vallirana

Municipalities in Baix Llobregat